The Cathedral of Our Lady of Perpetual Help  is a Catholic cathedral in Oklahoma City, Oklahoma, United States.  It is the seat of the Archdiocese of Oklahoma City.

History
Our Lady of Perpetual Help Parish was established in 1919 when Bishop Theophile Meerschaert, the first Bishop of Oklahoma City, assigned Monsignor Monnot its first pastor on January 19.  Mass for the parish was initially celebrated in an automobile showroom on Classen Boulevard.  The first church building was a wood structure built in May 1919 on NW 31st Street between Western and Lake.  The following month the parish held a ground breaking for a combination church and school building.

Construction of the present church building was begun on July 3, 1923, and was completed in February 1924.  A frame rectory was completed in July of the same year.  Pope Pius XI elevated Our Lady of Perpetual Help to a cathedral in 1931, replacing St. Joseph Cathedral downtown..

Thirty Vietnamese families, refugees from the Vietnam War, joined the parish in 1975.  Their numbers have continued to grow in the succeeding years.

The parish undertook a renovation project in 1993 that included a new pipe organ by W. Zimmer and Sons of Charlotte, North Carolina, a new baptistery, electrical and other additions to the parish plant.

Past rectors
Most Rev. Edward Weisenburger (2002-2012)

Parochial School
Our Lady of Perpetual Help School opened in September 1919 with 90 students in twelve grades.  Three Sisters of Mercy, who resided in a frame house across the street, served as faculty.  The parish changed the name of the school in 1932 to honor Bishop John Carroll, the first Catholic Bishop in the United States.  The parish added new wing to the school in 1939 and constructed a new convent in 1941.  The former convent is now called Mercy Center and houses a variety of parish functions.  As  part of the 1993 renovation project the parish constructed a gymnasium and classroom building.

See also
List of Catholic cathedrals in the United States
List of cathedrals in the United States

References

External links

 Official Cathedral Site
Roman Catholic Archdiocese of Oklahoma City Official Site

Churches in the Roman Catholic Archdiocese of Oklahoma City
Christian organizations established in 1919
Roman Catholic churches completed in 1924
Our Lady of Perpetual Help, Oklahoma City
Churches in Oklahoma City
Italianate architecture in Oklahoma
1919 establishments in Oklahoma
20th-century Roman Catholic church buildings in the United States
Italianate church buildings in the United States